The 2002 No Way Out was the fourth No Way Out professional wrestling pay-per-view (PPV) event produced by the World Wrestling Federation (WWF, now WWE). The event took place on February 17, 2002, at the Bradley Center in Milwaukee, Wisconsin. It was the final No Way Out promoted under the WWF name as the promotion was renamed to World Wrestling Entertainment (WWE) in May. It was also the final No Way Out event held before the WWF introduced the brand extension in March.

Eight professional wrestling matches were scheduled on the event's card. In the main event, Chris Jericho defeated Stone Cold Steve Austin to retain the Undisputed WWF Championship. In other prominent matches, Kurt Angle defeated Triple H to become the number one contender for the Undisputed WWF Championship, and The Rock defeated The Undertaker in a singles match.

This event is notable for the onscreen WWF debut of the New World Order (nWo), a dominant faction in World Championship Wrestling (WCW), which the WWF had acquired in March 2001. This iteration of the nWo consisted of the faction's three original members, Hollywood Hogan, Kevin Nash, and Scott Hall, with this also being their respective returns to the WWF. Coincidentally, No Way Out has the same three-letter abbreviation as the faction.

Production

Background
No Way Out was first held by the World Wrestling Federation (WWF, now WWE) as the 20th In Your House pay-per-view (PPV) in February 1998. Following the discontinuation of the In Your House series, No Way Out returned in February 2000 as its own PPV event, thus establishing it as the annual February PPV for the promotion. The 2002 event was the fourth event in the No Way Out chronology and was held on February 17 at the Bradley Center in Milwaukee, Wisconsin.

Storylines
The biggest storyline for No Way Out was when Vince McMahon revealed that he would unleash the New World Order (nWo) upon the World Wrestling Federation in an attempt to "kill (his) creation". Ever since he had become (kayfabe) equal ownership partners with Ric Flair in November 2001 (after Survivor Series), he had gone to great lengths to try to undermine Flair, which led to the angle. McMahon promised that he would not bring the nWo in if Flair agreed to sell his fifty percent stake in the WWF back to McMahon. Flair refused to sell, leading McMahon to reveal several vignettes over the next several weeks with Hollywood Hulk Hogan, Scott Hall, and Kevin Nash, the three original members of the nWo in World Championship Wrestling, appearing as McMahon's hired guns.

After defeating Kurt Angle on the January 28, 2002 episode of WWF Raw, Stone Cold Steve Austin earned a match at No Way Out for the Undisputed WWF Championship against champion Chris Jericho, to whom he had lost in the finals of the tournament to crown the first undisputed champion at Vengeance the previous December. Jericho had just retained the title against The Rock at the Royal Rumble. Afterward, he successfully defended the title again against Maven on the same night where Austin earned a title shot. Jericho and Austin spent the weeks before No Way Out getting back at each other, including a segment where Jericho knocked out Austin and poured beer all over him. On the February 14 episode of WWF SmackDown!, after Jericho got himself disqualified in his non-title match against Kane, Austin retaliated by assaulting Jericho then finished off Jericho with the Stone Cold Stunner then poured beer all over him.

After winning the 2002 Royal Rumble match, Triple H was guaranteed a shot at the Undisputed WWF Championship at WrestleMania X8. Kurt Angle, who Triple H last eliminated, felt that he should have won the Royal Rumble instead so he challenged Triple H to a match at No Way Out with his WrestleMania title shot on the line. Triple H accepted, but was also having trouble with Stephanie McMahon, his on-screen wife, outside the ring. It was due to the face Triple H growing tired of Stephanie's heel characteristics that had led to some hostility between the two. On the February 4, 2002 episode of Raw, Stephanie demanded that they renew their wedding vows on the following week because she was pregnant with their child. On the February 11, 2002 episode of Raw, just before the wedding, Triple H was met with a phone call by his mother-in-law Linda McMahon, who had sent him a video tape revealing that it was a trick, and the doctor that Stephanie had brought in to verify her pregnancy was fake. On the night of the ceremony, Triple H exposed the truth, and declared an end to their on-screen marriage. Three days later, on the February 14, 2002 episode of WWF SmackDown!, after Triple H and WWF Hardcore Champion Maven defeated Angle and The Undertaker by disqualification, Angle and Taker manhandled Triple H while Stephanie announced herself as the guest referee in the match between Triple H and Kurt Angle at No Way Out.

On the January 24, 2002 episode of SmackDown!, The Rock mocked The Undertaker for his quick elimination by Maven during the Royal Rumble match at the Royal Rumble. The Undertaker's interference led to The Rock losing to Kurt Angle in the Semi-finals tournament to challenge for the Undisputed championship at No Way Out. On the February 4, 2002 episode of Raw, during a tag team match, The Undertaker grabbed a steel lead pipe from his motorcycle and nailed The Rock in the head with it, allowing Chris Jericho to score the pinfall win. Three days later on SmackDown!, The Rock retaliated by hitting him with a chair and helping Maven win the WWF Hardcore Championship; however The Undertaker performed a Tombstone Piledriver on The Rock onto the hood of a limousine in revenge. A match was made between the two at No Way Out.

Event 

Before the event aired live on pay-per-view, a dark match took place in which Diamond Dallas Page defended the WWF European Championship against Big Boss Man, Page defeated Big Boss Man by disqualification.

Preliminary matches 
The event began with the New World Order (nWo) making their way to the ring. Kevin Nash later explained that the NWO wanted to prove that nobody was better than them. Scott Hall spoke briefly before Hollywood Hulk Hogan explained that the nWo did not want to kill the WWF but to be given a chance.

The first match was a Tag Team Turmoil match to determine the #1 contenders to the WWF Tag Team Championship at WrestleMania X8. Scotty 2 Hotty and Albert were the first eliminated by Christian and Lance Storm after Christian pinned Scotty following an Unprettier. Christian and Storm were eliminated by The Hardy Boyz (Matt Hardy and Jeff Hardy) after Jeff pinned Storm following a Swanton Bomb. The Dudley Boyz (Bubba Ray Dudley and D-Von Dudley) were eliminated by The Hardy Boyz after Matt pinned D-Von with a Roll Up. The Hardy Boyz were eliminated by Billy and Chuck after Gunn pinned Matt following a Fameasser. The APA (Faarooq and Bradshaw) eliminated Billy and Chuck after Bradshaw pinned Gunn following a Clothesline from Hell to win the match. 

Next, Rob Van Dam faced Goldust. Van Dam executed a Rolling Thunder Senton on Goldust for a near-fall. After Van Dam missed a Five Star Frog Splash, Goldust executed a DDT on Van Dam for a near-fall. Goldust attempted a Curtin Call on Van Dam but Van Dam countered the move and executed a Spinning Heel Kick on Goldust for a near-fall. Goldust attempted a Bulldog on Van Dam but Van Dam countered the move and performed a Step Over Spinning Heel Kick on Goldust. Van Dam pinned Goldust after a Five Star Frog Splash to win the match.

After that, Tazz and Spike Dudley defended the WWF Tag Team Championship against Booker T and Test. Test pinned Tazz but the referee noticed Test using the ropes for leverage, voiding the pinfall. After Test argued with the referee, Tazz forced Test to submit to the Tazzmission to retain the title. 

In the fourth match, William Regal defended the WWF Intercontinental Championship against Edge in a Brass Knuckles on a Pole match. Regal retrieved the brass knuckles but Edge knocked Regal off the top rope. Regal knocked the brass knuckles out of the ring to prevent Edge from using them. Edge performed a Spear on Regal and retrieved the brass knuckles whilst Regal pulled another pair out of his tights. Regal hit Edge with them and pinned Edge to retain the title.

Main event matches 
In the fifth match, The Rock faced The Undertaker. Undertaker executed a Chokeslam on Rock for a near-fall. Undertaker threw the referee into the steel steps and retrieved a lead pipe from his motorbike. Ric Flair interfered, attacking Undertaker but Undertaker performed a Big Boot on Flair. Undertaker attempted to hit Rock with the pipe but Rock applied the Sharpshooter on Undertaker. Vince McMahon interfered, distracting the referee. Rock attacked Vince, which distracted the referee. Undertaker attempted a Tombstone Piledriver on Rock but Flair hit Undertaker with the pipe and Rock pinned Undertaker after a Rock Bottom to win the match.

Next, Triple H and Kurt Angle wrestled to determine the #1 contender to the Undisputed WWF Championship at WrestleMania X8 with Stephanie McMahon as special guest referee. Angle attempted a Clothesline on Triple H but Triple H avoided the move, resulting in Angle knocking out Stephanie and Tim White replacing Stephanie as the referee. Angle attacked White and performed a low blow on Triple H whilst Stephanie returned to officiate. Angle applied an Ankle Lock on Triple H but Triple H countered the hold, resulting in Angle knocking Stephanie down again. After Angle missed a chair shot, Triple H performed a Pedigree on Angle and attempted a pin but Stephanie attacked White with a low blow. Triple H attempted a Pedigree on Stephanie but Angle hit Triple H with a chair and pinned Triple H after an Angle Slam to win the match. 

In the main event, Chris Jericho defended the Undisputed WWF Championship against Stone Cold Steve Austin. Austin fought with Jericho in the entrance way, where Austin threw Jericho into the production trucks. Whilst the referee was distracted, Jericho performed a low blow and two Lionsaults on Austin for a near-fall. Jericho applied the Walls of Jericho on Austin but Austin touched the ropes, forcing Jericho to break the hold. After Jericho retrieved the title belt, the referee was knocked down. Austin performed a Spinebuster on Jericho onto the title belt and attempted a Stone Cold Stunner on Jericho but Jericho countered the move into a Breakdown onto the title belt for a near-fall. After the referee was knocked down again, Austin forced Jericho to submit to the Walls of Jericho. Austin performed a Stone Cold Stunner on Jericho but the nWo interfered, attacking Austin. Hall performed a Stunner on Austin whilst Jericho helped the referee. Jericho pinned Austin to retain the title. After the match, Austin fought with the nWo but Hall performed another Stunner on Austin and Hall spray-painted the initials "NWO" on Austin's back while Nash and Hogan held him down, as the event ended.

Aftermath
After his win over Stone Cold Steve Austin, Chris Jericho aligned with Stephanie McMahon (with whom he had been feuding over the past few years), in an attempt to take down Triple H, who had won back his title shot on the episode of Raw immediately following No Way Out. Jericho lost the Undisputed WWF Championship to Triple H at WrestleMania X8, and also failed to win a rematch on the March 25 episode of Raw, in the process forcing Stephanie to, in storyline, leave the WWF per the pre-match stipulation. The feud with Triple H continued, and Jericho would get revenge a month later when he interfered in Triple H's championship defense against Hollywood Hulk Hogan at Backlash and cost him the title. The two would feud in the following weeks until Judgment Day, when Triple H defeated Chris Jericho in a Hell in a Cell match.

The nWo set their sights on Steve Austin and The Rock. Austin wrestled and defeated Scott Hall at WrestleMania X8, while The Rock wrestled and defeated Hogan at the same event. Afterwards, Austin would continue to pursue the Undisputed title until he abruptly walked out of the company in June, and The Rock left for three months to make another film. Hogan was kicked out of the nWo after WrestleMania and, as mentioned above, later challenged Triple H for the Undisputed WWF Championship at Backlash and won it, tying him with Austin and The Rock for the record for most WWF Championship wins (which at that time was six and has since been broken twice; John Cena currently holds the record with 13). Scott Hall defeated Bradshaw at Backlash, but was released less than a month later. Kevin Nash injured his biceps shortly after his debut and was relegated to a non-wrestling role within the nWo until July, when he suffered a torn quadriceps tendon in his first match back and missed the remainder of the year.

After losing to The Rock, The Undertaker would feud with Ric Flair, which ended with Undertaker picking up the win at WrestleMania X8.

Spike Dudley and Tazz would lose the WWF Tag Team Championship to Billy and Chuck shortly after No Way Out. Billy and Chuck would soon go on to successfully defend them at WrestleMania X8 against The Hardy Boyz, The Dudley Boyz, and The APA in the four teams elimination match.

William Regal would go on to defend the WWF Intercontinental Championship against Rob Van Dam at WrestleMania X8, where Van Dam would get the first of six career reigns as Intercontinental Champion. After losing to Regal at No Way Out, Edge would enter a very short feud with Booker T, which included Edge's first singles win at a WrestleMania event. After losing to Van Dam at No Way Out, Goldust entered the Hardcore division, where he would win the WWF Hardcore Championship nine times.

No Way Out 2002 was the last No Way Out held under the WWF name, as the promotion was renamed to World Wrestling Entertainment (WWE) in May. It was also the last No Way Out held before the promotion introduced the brand extension in March, a storyline subdivision in which the promotion divided its roster into two separate brands, Raw and SmackDown!, where wrestlers were exclusively assigned to perform.

Results

Tag Team Turmoil

References

External links
No Way Out 2002 official website

Events in Milwaukee
2002
2002 in Wisconsin
Professional wrestling in Milwaukee
2002 WWE pay-per-view events
February 2002 events in the United States

es:WWE No Way Out#2002